Visitations may refer to:
 Heraldic visitation
 Brooklyn Visitations, an American basketball team based in Brooklyn, New York City 
 Paterson Visitations, an American basketball team based in Paterson, New Jersey 
 Visitations (Clinic album), 2006
 Visitations (The Juan MacLean album)
 The Visitations, Dave Wrathgeber of Fablefactory's solo project